The Dark Enlightenment, also called the neo-reactionary movement (sometimes abbreviated to NRx), is an anti-democratic, anti-egalitarian, reactionary philosophical and political movement. In 2007 and 2008, software engineer Curtis Yarvin, writing under the pen name Mencius Moldbug, articulated what would develop into Dark Enlightenment thinking. Yarvin's theories were elaborated and expanded by philosopher Nick Land, who first coined the term Dark Enlightenment in his essay of the same name. The term "Dark Enlightenment" is a reaction to the Age of Enlightenment.

The ideology generally rejects Whig historiography—the concept that history shows an inevitable progression towards greater liberty and enlightenment, culminating in liberal democracy and constitutional monarchy—in favor of a return to traditional societal constructs and forms of government, including absolute monarchism and other older forms of leadership such as cameralism.

In July 2010, Arnold Kling, an adjunct scholar at the Cato Institute, coined the term "neo-reactionaries" to describe Yarvin and his followers.

Overview  
Neo-reactionaries are an informal community of bloggers and political theorists who have been active since the 2000s. Steve Sailer and Hans-Hermann Hoppe are contemporary forerunners of the ideology, which also draws influence from philosophers such as Thomas Carlyle and Julius Evola.

Central to Land's ideas is a belief in freedom's incompatibility with democracy. Land drew inspiration from libertarians such as Peter Thiel, as indicated in his essay The Dark Enlightenment. The Dark Enlightenment has been described by journalists and commentators as alt-right and neo-fascist. A 2016 article in New York magazine notes that "Neoreaction has a number of different strains, but perhaps the most important is a form of post-libertarian futurism that, realizing that libertarians aren't likely to win any elections, argues against democracy in favor of authoritarian forms of government."

Andy Beckett stated that "NRx" supporters "believe in the replacement of modern nation-states, democracy and government bureaucracies by authoritarian city states, which on neoreaction blogs sound as much like idealised medieval kingdoms as they do modern enclaves such as Singapore."

According to criminal justice professor George Michael, neoreaction seeks to save its ideal of Western civilization through adoption of a monarchical, or CEO model of government to replace democracy. It also embraces the notion of "acceleration", first articulated by Vladimir Lenin as "worse is better", but in the neoreaction version, the creation and promotion of ever more societal crises hastens the adoption of the neoreactive state instead of a communist one.

Other focuses of neoreaction often include an idealization of physical fitness; a rationalist or utilitarian justification for social stratification based on intelligence, based on either heredity or meritocracy; an embrace of Classical philosophy, and traditional gender roles.

When approached by The Atlantic political affairs reporter Rosie Gray, Yarvin attempted to troll her on Twitter, and blogger Nick B. Steves said that her IQ was inadequate to the task of interviewing him and that, as a journalist, she was "the enemy".

By mid-2017, NRx had moved to forums such as the Social Matter online forum, the Hestia Society, and Thermidor Magazine. 

In 2021, Yarvin appeared on Fox News' "Tucker Carlson Today", where he discussed the United States' withdrawal from Afghanistan and his concept of the "Cathedral", which he claims to be the current aggregation of political power and influential institutions that is controlling the country.

Criticism 
Journalist Andrew Sullivan argues that neoreaction's pessimistic appraisal of democracy dismisses many advances that have been made and that global manufacturing patterns also limit the economic independence that sovereign states can have from one another.

In an article for The Sociological Review, after an examination of neoreaction's core tenets, Roger Burrows deplores the ideology as "hyper-neoliberal, technologically deterministic, anti-democratic, anti-egalitarian, pro-eugenicist, racist and, likely, fascist", and ridicules the entire accelerationist framework as a faulty attempt at "mainstreaming... misogynist, racist and fascist discourses." He criticizes neoreaction's racial principles and for their brazen "disavowal of any discourses" advocating for socio-economic equality and, accordingly, considers it a "eugenic philosophy" in favor of what Land deems 'hyper-racism'.

Relation to the alt-right 
Some consider the Dark Enlightenment part of the alt-right, representing its theoretical branch. The Dark Enlightenment has been labelled by some as neo-fascist, and by University of Chichester professor Benjamin Noys as "an acceleration of capitalism to a fascist point." Land disputes the similarity between his ideas and fascism, claiming that "Fascism is a mass anti-capitalist movement," whereas he prefers that "[capitalist] corporate power should become the organizing force in society."

Journalist and pundit James Kirchick states that "although neo-reactionary thinkers disdain the masses and claim to despise populism and people more generally, what ties them to the rest of the alt-right is their unapologetically racist element, their shared misanthropy and their resentment of mismanagement by the ruling elites."

Scholar Andrew Jones, in a 2019 article, postulated that the Dark Enlightenment (i.e. the NeoReactionary Movement) is "key to understanding the Alt-Right" political ideology. "The use of affect theory, postmodern critiques of modernity, and a fixation on critiquing regimes of truth," Jones remarks, "are fundamental to NeoReaction (NRx) and what separates it from other Far-Right theory". Moreover, Jones argues that Dark Enlightenment's fixation on aesthetics, history, and philosophy, as opposed to the traditional empirical approach, distinguishes it from related far-right ideologies.

Historian Joe Mulhall, writing for The Guardian, described Nick Land as "propagating very far-right ideas." Despite neoreaction's limited online audience, Mulhall considers the ideology to have "acted as both a tributary into the alt-right and as a key constituent part [of the alt-right]."

See also 

 Authoritarian capitalism
 Democracy: The God That Failed
 Intellectual dark web
 Natural order (philosophy)
 New Right (South Korea)
 Sadaejuui
 Paleolibertarianism
 Paleoconservatism
 Post-truth
 Reactionary modernism
 Right-wing antiscience
 Social constructionism
 Social Darwinism

References

External links 
 

 
Alt-right
Reactionary
Counter-revolutionaries
Far-right politics
Fascism
Paleoconservatism
Paleolibertarianism
Political theories
Schools of thought
Monarchism